Dalaca pallens is a species of moth of the family Hepialidae. It is known from Chile and Argentina.

References

External links
Hepialidae genera

Moths described in 1852
Hepialidae
Moths of South America